Hell's Highway is a 1932 American pre-Code film directed by Rowland Brown.

Plot
The film centers around brutal conditions in a prison of the Southern United States. Chain gang prisoners forced to construct a "liberty highway" for their overseer chasten under his brutal stewardship. Duke Ellis is the most influential inmate among them. He soon discovers his younger brother has also been incarcerated and joined the chain gang. Soon enough Duke will mastermind a mass riot.

Cast
 Richard Dix as Frank "Duke" Ellis
 Tom Brown as John "Johnny" Ellis
 Rochelle Hudson as Mary Ellen
 C. Henry Gordon as "Blacksnake Skinner"
 Oscar Apfel as William Billings
 Stanley Fields as F.E. Whiteside
 John Arledge as Joe Carter
 Warner Richmond as "Captain Pop-Eye Jackson"
 Charles B. Middleton as "Matthew The Hermit"
 Louise Carter as Mrs. Ellis
 Clarence Muse as Rascal
 Fuzzy Knight as "Society Red"

References

External links
 
 
 
 

1932 films
1932 drama films
American drama films
American black-and-white films
RKO Pictures films
1930s prison films
Films directed by Rowland Brown
Films set in the United States
1930s English-language films
1930s American films